The J.League Player of the Year (formerly known as the "J.League Most Valuable Player Award" from 1993 to 2020) is awarded by the J.League to the most valuable player of the season.

J1 League Winners

Wins by club

J2 League Winners

J3 League Winners

See also
J.League awards

References

External Links 

 ULTRAZONE Website : All-Time Award Winners 

J.League Player of the Year
J.League trophies and awards
MVP
Annual events in Japan
Association football player non-biographical articles
Association football player of the year awards by competition